Dyerville is a former settlement in Humboldt County, California. Earliest known development at Dyerville was the operation of a ferry in the 1870s. Dyerville had its own post office from  April 17, 1890, to November 30, 1933, when it was moved to South Fork.

Dyerville was a stagecoach stop, a shipping port, and a crossroads town that played an important role in the early settlement of this redwood area.  It was destroyed by the flood of 1955.

References

Former settlements in Humboldt County, California
Former populated places in California